Billy Dale Vessels (March 22, 1931 – November 17, 2001) was a gridiron football player.   He played college football at the University of Oklahoma and won the Heisman Trophy in 1952.  Vessels went on to play professional football with the National Football League's Baltimore Colts and the Western Interprovincial Football Union's Edmonton Eskimos.

College football career
Vessels led the Oklahoma Sooners to the national championship in 1950, scoring 15 touchdowns. In 1952, he won the Heisman Trophy. Playing under the legendary Bud Wilkinson, he became the first of seven Sooners, followed by Steve Owens (1969), Billy Sims (1978), Jason White (2003), Sam Bradford (2008), Baker Mayfield (2017), and Kyler Murray (2018) to win the award. During the 1952 season he rushed for 1,072 yards including seven 100 yard performances, and 17 touchdowns. These achievements led to his induction into the College Football Hall of Fame in 1974.

He was also a member of the Sigma Nu fraternity at the University of Oklahoma, along with being a member of the Army Reserve Officers' Training Corps.

Professional football career
Vessels was the first pick of the Baltimore Colts in the first round of the 1953 NFL Draft, but did not join the Colts following the draft, electing instead to play with the Edmonton Eskimos of the then Western Interprovincial Football Union.  During his rookie season in 1953, Vessels led the WIFU, the forerunner of the CFL Western Conference (later changed to Division) in rushing with 926 yards on 129 carries and with eight rushing touchdowns. He caught 20 passes for 310 yards and with one touchdown. Vessels also passed 393 yards on 30 attempts with 18 completions and 4 touchdown passes to having thrown only one interception and while on defence he snagged four interceptions.
 
Vessels became the first player to win the Schenley Award as the Canadian Rugby-Football Union's (CRU) Most Outstanding Player (the CFL did not come into existence until 1958).  Vessels played only the one season in Canada. Vessels played one game with the Kitchener-Waterloo Dutchmen of the ORFU who were acting as a farm team for Edmonton in 1954 - this was to try and qualify Vessels as a non-import under the rules at that time.  In 1956, he joined the NFL's Baltimore Colts, the team that had drafted him three years prior.  That season, his only for the Colts, he had 11 receptions for 177 yards and a touchdown plus returned 16 kickoffs for 379 yards. Unfortunately, Vessels' professional career in the NFL was cut short by a leg injury.

Later life
  After his football career, Vessels was employed for many years by The Mackle Company, one of Florida's leading developers.  In the 1970s, he became involved in horse breeding and served on the Florida Pari-Mutuel Commission from 1976 to 1983, becoming its executive director. He was elected president of the National Association of State Racing Commissions in 1984 and served as director of the Florida division of Pari-Mutuel Wagering from 1987 to 1989.

Honors
In September 2003, Cleveland, Oklahoma renamed its high school football stadium "Billy Vessels Memorial Stadium" in honor of Vessels. In 2007, the University of Oklahoma, through the state's Centennial Celebration, awarded the Vessels Heisman statue to Cleveland, Oklahoma, where it sits across from Cleveland High School in front of the school's gymnasium and event center. OU replaced its statue, and those of its other Heisman winners, the next spring.

References

External links
 
 
 

1931 births
2001 deaths
American football halfbacks
American players of Canadian football
Canadian football running backs
Baltimore Colts announcers
Baltimore Colts players
Edmonton Elks players
Oklahoma Sooners football players
National Football League announcers
All-American college football players
Canadian Football League Most Outstanding Player Award winners
College Football Hall of Fame inductees
Heisman Trophy winners
People from Cleveland, Oklahoma
Players of American football from Oklahoma
Ontario Rugby Football Union players